The Ertil  is a river within the basin of the Don in Voronezh Oblast and Tambov Oblast, Russia. The Ertil is a left tributary of the Bityug.

References

Rivers of Voronezh Oblast
Rivers of Tambov Oblast